The Energy Future Coalition is a nonpartisan public policy initiative that seeks to speed the transition to a new energy economy. Combining expertise and advocacy, the Coalition brings together business, labor, and environmental groups to identify new directions in energy policy with broad political support.

The Energy Future Coalition works closely with the United Nations Foundation, with which it is co-located, on energy and climate policy, especially energy access, energy efficiency, and bioenergy issues.

Mission 

The Energy Future Coalition is an ambitious, visionary effort by business, labor, and environmental groups to bridge their differences and identify broadly supported energy policy options that address three great challenges related to the production and use of energy:

The political and economic threat posed by the world's dependence on oil.
The risk to the global environment from climate change.
The lack of access of the world's poor to the modern energy services they need for economic advancement.

The Coalition seeks to connect those challenges with a vision of the vibrant economic opportunities that will be created by a transition to a new energy economy.  On the third challenge, the Coalition works closely with its sister organization, the United Nations Foundation.

Steering Committee 

Frances Beinecke, President, Natural Resources Defense Council
Richard Branson, Chairman, The Virgin Group
Rev. Richard Cizik, Principal, The New Evangelical Partnership for the Common Good
Charles B. Curtis, Deputy Secretary of Energy under President Bill Clinton; Chairman, Federal Energy Regulatory Commission under President Jimmy Carter; President, Nuclear Threat Initiative
Tom Daschle, Senior Policy Advisor, DLA Piper; Distinguished Senior Fellow, Center for American Progress; former U.S. Senator from South Dakota and Senate Majority Leader
Scott DeFife, Executive Vice President, Policy and Government Affairs, National Restaurant Association
Susan Eisenhower, President, Eisenhower Group; Chair Emeritus, The Eisenhower Institute
Vic Fazio, Senior Advisor, Akin Gump Strauss Hauer & Feld; former Member of Congress
Maggie Fox, CEO and President, Alliance for Climate Protection
Michael V. Finley, President, Turner Foundation
Robert W. Fri, Deputy Administrator of the U.S. Environmental Protection Agency under President Richard Nixon and of the Energy Research and Development Administration under President Gerald Ford; Visiting Scholar and former President, Resources for the Future
C. Boyden Gray, Founder, Boyden Gray & Associates; U.S. Ambassador to the European Union under  President George W. Bush; White House Counsel under President George H. W. Bush
Andy Karsner, CEO and Founder, Manifest Energy, LLC; Assistant Secretary of Energy for Energy Efficiency and Renewable Energy under President George W. Bush
Suedeen Kelly, Partner, Patton Boggs; Former Commissioner, Federal Energy Regulatory Commission
Vinod Khosla, Partner, Khosla Ventures
Thea Mei Lee, Deputy Chief of Staff, AFL-CIO
Thomas E. Lovejoy, Biodiversity Chair, The H. John Heinz III Center for Science, Economics and the Environment; Former Chief Scientist and Counselor, Smithsonian Institution
Vice Admiral Dennis V. McGinn, President, American Council on Renewable Energy (ACORE)
John D. Podesta, Chair and Counselor, Center for American Progress; White House Chief of Staff under President Bill Clinton
Stephanie Herseth Sandlin, Principal Attorney, Olsson Frank Weeda Terman Bode Matz PC; former Member of Congress
Larry Schweiger, President and CEO, National Wildlife Federation
Steve Symms, Partner, Parry, Romani, DeConcini & Symms; former U.S. Senator from Idaho
Ted Turner, Chairman, United Nations Foundation, Turner Foundation, and Nuclear Threat Initiative; Chairman, Turner Enterprises
Timothy E. Wirth, President, United Nations Foundation; former U.S. Senator from Colorado; Under Secretary of State for Global Affairs under President Bill Clinton

History 

In late 2001, with the support of the Turner Foundation and Better World Fund, the Energy Future Coalition held exploratory meetings to discuss the inadequacies in U.S. energy policy. These meetings were focused on addressing our dependence on foreign oil and the associated risk to our economy and national security, the neglected threat of climate change, and the need to bring electricity and modern fuels to the two billion people who lack them.

A consensus emerged on the need for change, and on the opportunity to present a new vision that linked security, environment, and economics for a more sustainable future. Over the next six months, more than 150 individuals from business, labor, government, academia, and the NGO community came together to create a compelling new vision of what the energy economy could become, and to identify policy changes that would spark a revolution in energy technology.

The Coalition focused on practical political coalition building, aimed at breaking the gridlock along partisan lines that had previously prevented substantive advances in energy policy. The Coalition created six Working Groups of diverse participants that participated in a nine-month effort to identify a new path forward. These working groups presented recommendations in the areas of transportation, bioenergy and agriculture, the future of coal, end-use efficiency, the smart grid, and innovative financing for international energy development. The original recommendations formulated by the working groups can be found in the 2003 report, Challenges and Opportunities: Charting America's Energy Future.

Elements of the Coalition's recommendations were included in the Energy Policy Act of 2005 (EPAct 2005).

Building on the Coalition's Bioenergy and Agriculture Working Group, a group of agriculture and forestry leaders developed the 25x'25 vision, which states that America should produce 25% of its energy from renewable resources by 2025. In the Energy Independence and Security Act of 2007 Congress endorsed 25x'25 as a goal for the nation.

In 2007, the Coalition began working at the state level on the cheapest and fastest way to meet our energy needs—energy efficiency.  In 2008, the Coalition launched exploratory meetings into what would become the Rebuilding America initiative.  In 2010, Rebuilding America developed federal legislation to incentivize commercial building energy efficiency upgrades via federal rebates.  The legislation became known as Building STAR, and while it ultimately failed to pass, it laid the foundation for Rebuilding America's continuing work in the commercial building energy efficiency sector at the federal, state, and local levels.

Americans for a Clean Energy Grid was launched in 2010 as an outgrowth of the Coalition’s work on the smart grid.  This initiative brings together a diverse group of stakeholders to support policies that scale up a cleaner electricity system by unlocking domestic renewable energy resources currently stranded in our country’s remote areas and deploying smart technologies to make the transmission and distribution grid more reliable, resilient, and secure, accommodate renewable power, and enable more energy efficiency by consumers and businesses.

Renewable energy organizations based in the United States
Organizations established in 2001
2001 establishments in Washington, D.C.